Prince Khosrow Mirza Qajar (1813 – 21 October 1875) was the seventh son of Abbas Mirza and grandson of Fath-Ali Shah, King of Iran.

Khosrow Mirza is best known for his "Apology Mission" to the Russian Empire after the murder of Alexander Griboyedov by peasants and for the gifting of Shah diamonds to Nicholas I. His travelogue details his travels and experiences in Russia. After his return to Iran, he was appointed as an advisor of his father Abbas Mirza, and as a financial advisor for Iran's Khorasan province.

After the death of his father, Fath-Ali Shah appointed Khosrow Mirza's elder brother Mohammad Mirza as Crown prince. After the Shah's death, although Khosrow was on good terms with him, he and his brother Djahangir Mirza were imprisoned in a castle in Ardabil on Mohammad Mirza's orders. In the first days of Mohammad Shah's reign, he blinded both of his brothers to prevent them from becoming pretenders to the throne. After Qa'em-Maqam was killed, Khosrow Mirza found a chance to escape from prison and was appointed as the royal financial administrator and later fought in Mohammad Shah's expedition of Herat. He spent the last years of his life in Hamadan and died on 21 October 1875.

Early life

Prince Khosrow Mirza was born in early 1813 in the Shams ol Emareh palace at Tabriz. His mother Khurde Khanum was a daughter of a Turkmen Bey. Khosrow Mirza spent his childhood with his mother and later with his three brothers Djahangir Mirza, Ahmad Mirza and Mostafa Gholi Mirza. He was Abbas Mirza's favourite son. At age of seven, Khosrow Mirza was entrusted to his uncle Hussein-Ali Bey; he was trained to ride and wield weapons. From the age of nine, Khosrow Mirza began to study Arabic and Azerbaijani languages, various sciences, the works of the great poets of the East and the rules of decency. He found he had outstanding abilities in sciences and was considered the best rider in his father's court.

In early 1826, Khosrow Mirza was appointed the company commander of the guards battalion, a special battalion that was trained by British instructors. He fought during the Russo-Persian War of 1826-1828; he witnessed major defeats for the Persian army and watched the peace negotiations. In July 1827, Alexander Griboyedov was sent to Abbas Mirza's camp at near Tabriz for negotiations, where he first met Khosrow Mirza. These negotiations were fruitless and the war continued until that October, when Lieutenant General Eristov captured Tabriz, the capital of the heir's province, and Abbas Mirza agreed to start peace negotiations. On 5 November 1827, Khosrow Mirza had a meeting with Count Ivan Paskevich. The meeting was primarily a peace negotiation but there was also a horse-riding challenge and Khosrow Mirza read Rumi poems for him. According to Markelov, Paskevich liked his "Noble behavior" and saw him as a "rightful prince". According to Ekhtiar, Abbas Mirza deliberately send Khosrow Mirza to test his diplomatic abilities and after the talks, he was made diplomatic secretary. On 8 February 1828, peace negotiations were resumed in the village Torkamanchay. The peace deal was signed in the presence of  Khosrow Mirza and his brother Djahangir Mirza.

"Apology Mission"

Griboyedov's death
On 6 October 1828, Alexander Griboyedov with his young wife Nino Chavchavadze and the whole board arrived in Tehran; the next day, Abbas Mirza wrote him a letter wishing him a good experience in Iran. Griboyedov was also greeted by Khosrow Mirza. In early January, Abbas Mirza wrote a letter to Count Paskevich to say he would like to travel to Saint Petersburg in February on a friendly visit to Tsar Nicholas I. Khosrow Mirza would accompany his father on this trip. Abbas Mirza's secretary Mirza Saleh arrived in Tiflis to see Paskevich on 7 February 1829 with this message and stayed there to wait for Abbas Mirza. Shortly after, however, a group of peasants attacked the Russian embassy and killed Griboyedov and most of his staff.

The trip

Immediately after news of the death reached Tabriz, Abbas Mirza ordered fortresses to be built throughout Tabriz in case of war. Knowing of Khosrow Mirza's successful diplomatic negotiations with Count Paskevich, Fath-Ali Shah made a firman to Abbas Mirza in which he ordered him to send a committee led by Khosrow Mirza to Saint Petersburg to apologize to the Tsar. Khosrow Mirza's mission was extremely important, not only for Iranian and Russian sides but for all participants in the Great Game, therefore, figures from both sides tried to execute this mission well. For example, Denis Davydov, who had been at Tabriz, attempted to get Mirza a meeting with the Tsar, and enlisted the help of Count Paskevich to accomplish this goal. 

Neither sides desire another war for the last one had Iran completely devastated and Russian main army was located in the Ottoman borders. An apology, quick and efficient, would put the affair into an end, which was exactly what Nicholas I wanted. Thus in early April 1829, an acceptance letter with the Tsar's stamp reached Tabriz. Shortly after, a committee led by Khosrow Mirza accompanied with gifts left for Saint Petersburg. The committee included Mirza Mohammed Khan Zangana, Mirza Masud Garmarudi, Mirza Saleh Shirazi, Hossein Ali Beg (Khosrow Mirza's uncle), Mirza Taqi Khan Farahani (future Amir Kabir), Mirza Baba Afshar, Fazel Khan Garrusi, Mohammad Hossein Khan, Magniago de Borea (Khosrow Mirza's French tutor) and Barthélémy Semino (a French military advisor).

The committee crossed the Aras River on 9 May and met Count Paskevich at Tiflis on 19 May. On 4 June, they left Tiflis and arrived in Moscow on 26bJuly. During the trip from Tiflis to Novgorod, they were joined by Count P. P. Sukhtelen and three translators, who were ordered to spy on Mirza. Once in Moscow, Khosrow Mirza visited Griboyedov's mother and shed tears with her. Mirza's group was housed at the Grand Kremlin Palace. During his time in Moscow, he visited attractions such as the Bolshoi Theater and Imperial Moscow University, and spoke to both scholars and peasants. Khosrow Mirza also met Nikolay Yusupov and had dinner with him. According to George Bournoutian:

On 11 August, the committees arrived at Saint Petersburg and were housed at Tauride Palace. Khosrow Mirza visited Tsarskoye Selo, Peterhof Palace and the Winter Palace. He was welcomed by princes and princesses, and made speeches. On 22 August, in an official ceremony, Khosrow Mirza read Fath-Ali Shah's letter for Tsar. Khosrow Mirza and his retinue were showered with gifts, including 12 state-of-the-art guns. Khosrow Mirza presented the Imperial family with gifts from the Shah, among which was a large 88.7-carat Shah diamond, 20 precious manuscripts, two cashmere carpets, a pearl necklace for the Empress, a saber for the heir Alexander and jewelry for the Grand Princesses. According to Bournoutian, the committee stayed until 27 February the following year, and Khosrow Mirza charmed the royal family and managed to reduce Iran's  war indemnity payment. Khosrow Mirza and his group returned to Tabriz on 15 March 1830, and were gloriously welcomed by Abbas Mirza.

The travelogue

Khosrow Mirza's travelogue to Saint Petersburg was written by Mirza Masud's secretary Mirza Mustafa Afshar, who was with Khosrow Mirza throughout the trip. The book originally had six chapters but the final chapter has been lost. In the travelouge, there is a detailed report of the Iranians' treatment of Russian factories, modern industries, balloons, lithography, museums, greenhouses, taxidermy, and much more. The author praises the Russian's technological progress and regrets the Iranians are deprived of these fields. He also suggests sending students from Iran to Russia and France to study the sciences.

He also compared the Russian treasury, which was based on the circulation of assets in the country's economic flow, to the traditional Iranian method of collecting taxes and revenues in the treasury. He also reported on the construction of a community church and the erection of its large columns with the help of cranes, and was amazed to see lithography and balloon flights. Other industries and inventions mentioned include theaters, academies, bladesmithing, glass production, thermometers, museums, and more.

He also mentions political details such as the borders of the Russian Empire, the occupations of the country, the number and characteristics of its citizens, and the products and animals of Russia. It is also the first work during the Qajar period that mentions Alaska, which he considers to be part of Russia. According to Ekhtiar, Mirza Taqi Khan Farahani, who was present on the trip, saw all of developments and after reading Mirza Mostafa's report, he was inspired to build Dar ul-Funun polytechnic.

Later life

Khosrow Mirza's success made him a firm contender for the throne, and both his father and grandfather placed him against his brother Mohammad Mirza. Though there was initially little rivalry between the two brothers, in 1831, Fath-Ali Shah granted Governorship of Kerman to Khosrow Mirza and Abbas Mirza made him his advisor. According to Nafisi, Mohammad Mirza developed a grudge against Khosrow Mirza out of fear of losing his chance to rule. After Abbas Mirza's death in 1833 and the illness of Fath-Ali Shah in 1834, Mohammad Mirza was granted a chance to remove Khosrow Mirza and his brother Djahangir Mirza from the line of succession. On Mohammad Mirza's order, Khosrow Mirza and Djahangir Mirza were imprisoned in a castle in Ardabil. Count Ivan Simonich, the new envoy, wanted to ensure Article VII of the Treaty of Turkmenchay was observed so he approved the succession of Mohammad Mirza. Khosrow Mirza, who had no desire for the crown, hoped the Tsar would release him from prison. With the death of Fath-Ali Shah and the coronation of Mohammad Shah, both brothers were blinded.

In 1835, after the death of Qa'em-Maqam and replacement of Haji Mirza Aqasi, Khosrow Mirza was freed and with the support of new prime minister, became the Royal Finance Administer. He was moved to the vicinity of Hamadan. Khosrow Mirza later fought in the Siege of Herat and recorded all of casualties of war. He died at the age of 62 in Hamadan on 21 October 1875.

Appearance and skills 

According to Bournoutian; "During his stay [In Russia], [Khosrow Mirza] often visited Theaters – Russian and French – which in those days were full of the audience, eager to see their beloved guest; his happy physiognomy drew the attention of even the mob; the crowd always stood in front of the house where he was staying, and when he left he was accompanied by a run somewhere."

When Khosrow Mirza was 16 years old; according to contemporaries, he "was of average height, slender, had charming eyes and an unusually pleasant smile; possessed liveliness in conversation, and was remarkably affable in handling ".

Alexandra Smirnova wrote:

Dorothea de Ficquelmont described him in her diary

In popular culture

 Khosow Mirza is shown as a colorful character in Nikolai Gogol's short story "The Nose" and in the opera "The Nose" by Dmitri Shostakovich, which is based on it.
 Khosrow Mirza's speech to the Tsar was recreated in the 2002 film "Russian Ark".
 The 1977 Iranian television series "Khosrow Mirza II" is based on a story about his descendants.

References

Bibliography 

 

 
 
 

 
 

Qajar princes
1813 births
1875 deaths
19th-century Iranian politicians
Qajar governors
Rulers of Kerman
People from Tabriz